Fox Technical High School is a public high school located in central San Antonio, Texas (USA) and classified as a 4A school by the UIL. This school is one of twelve schools in the San Antonio Independent School District. In 2015, the school was rated "Met Standard" by the Texas Education Agency.

History
San Antonio High School was established in 1882.  In 1917, it was rebuilt and renamed Main Avenue High School.  In 1932, the campus was repurposed as a vocational school, and at that time it acquired its present name, Fox Technical High School.  Students from the old Main Avenue High School who intended to continue pursuing academic studies were sent to the newly built Thomas Jefferson High School.

In 2017, The Centers for Applied Science and Technology (CAST) opened a charter-school in Fox Tech's two freshly-renovated building, that were the Freshman buildings. This CAST school was named CAST Tech which uses computer-based learning to allow students to progress more quickly in areas where they have mastered concepts, allowing them to dive more deeply into projects and areas of great interest.

Athletics
The Fox Tech Buffaloes compete in the following sports:

Basketball
Cross Country
Golf
Swimming and Diving
Tennis
Track and Field
Volleyball
Water Polo

References

External links
 

High schools in San Antonio
San Antonio Independent School District high schools
1932 establishments in Texas